Mbololo (or Mpololo) was a Litunga (chief) of Makololo tribe, a successor of Liswaniso. He ruled from 1863 to 1864. He was the last king of the Makololo dynasty.

Biography

Family
Mbololo was a brother of the King Sebetwane and uncle of the Queen Mamochisane and King Sekeletu.

Reign
He was a successor of the king Liswaniso and he seized the kingship in 1863. He was even more unpopular then Sekeletu.

He was very cruel and was overthrown by a force led by a Lozi contingent from the north in August 1864. After his death general Njekwa destroyed Makololo.

View of Coillard
The French missionary François Coillard, who had read much of David Livingstone’s work noted:

Sources
Makololo interregnum and the legacy of David Livingstone (PDF)
Dictionary of African historical biography by Mark R. Lipschutz and R. Kent Rasmussen
Trade and Travel in Early Barotseland by George Westbeech, Edward C. Tabler, Norman Magnus MacLeod
Iron Age Cultures in Zambia: Dambwa, Ingombe Ilede, and the Tonga by Brian M. Fagan, D. W. Phillipson, and S. G. H. Daniels

Litungas
History of Zambia
19th-century monarchs in Africa